Márta Peterdy-Wolf (born Márta Popp; 21 March 1923) is a Hungarian former professional tennis player.

Peterdy-Wolf, a four-time national singles champion, also competed at national championship level as a figure skater early in her sporting career. She featured regularly at the French Championships and Wimbledon from the 1940s through to the 1960s, making it as far as the third round in both tournaments. Following the Hungarian Revolution of 1956 she lived in exile in the French capital Paris and was considered stateless.

References

External links
  (wrong age)

1923 births
Possibly living people
Hungarian female tennis players
French female tennis players
Hungarian exiles
Hungarian emigrants to France